Esther Cheah Mei Lan (born 31 March 1986) is a Malaysian female medal winning tenpin bowler who has represented Malaysia in several international competitive events including Asian Games, Southeast Asian Games. She is currently considered one of the most experienced and finest female bowlers to have represented Malaysia internationally.

Biography 
Cheah was born in Petaling Jaya on 31 March 1986. Her father Holloway Cheah inspired her to practice the sport of bowling during her childhood as her father was also a former tenpin bowler who claimed a gold medal in bowling at the 1978 Asian Games. Cheah is also coached by her own father who is also the current national coach for the Malaysian tenpin bowling team.

Career 
Cheah rose to prominence in international level after claiming a stunning gold medal just at the age of 19 in the women's singles at the 2005 WTBA World Tenpin Bowling Championships, which was also her first senior level competitive event.

After her debut success at the 2005 WTBA Championships, she made her Asian Games debut representing Malaysia at the 2006 Asian Games and went onto claim 6 medals including 2 gold and 4 silver medals at the 2006 Asian Games. During the event, she also registered in history for becoming the first Malaysian female to win an Asian Games gold in women's singles bowling event after defeating Indonesian Putty Armein in the final. At the 2006 Asian Games, Cheah followed the footsteps of her father by winning gold in the team of five category at an Asian Games competition whereas her father also clinched gold medal in the relevant event for men during the 1978 Asian Games.

She was nominated as one of the recipients for the Malaysian prestigious sport award Anugerah Sukan Negara for Sportswoman of the Year in 2006 and 2012. She was part of the Malaysian women's bowling team which received the 2017 Team of the Year award at the 2017 Malaysian National Sports Awards.

Cheah claimed her third Asian Games gold medal and her first Asian Games gold medal since 2006 in the women's trio event at the 2018 Asian Games. This also ultimately became the first gold medal for Malaysia at the 2018 Asian Games and also was the first Asian Games gold medal in bowling for Malaysia at the Asian Games since 2006. However Malaysian women's bowling team couldn't secure a gold medal in the women's team of six event during the 2018 Asian Games as they were thrashed by South Korea.

References 

1986 births
Living people
Malaysian ten-pin bowling players
Bowlers at the 2006 Asian Games
Bowlers at the 2010 Asian Games
Bowlers at the 2014 Asian Games
Bowlers at the 2018 Asian Games
Medalists at the 2006 Asian Games
Medalists at the 2010 Asian Games
Medalists at the 2018 Asian Games
Asian Games gold medalists for Malaysia
Asian Games silver medalists for Malaysia
Asian Games bronze medalists for Malaysia
Asian Games medalists in bowling
Southeast Asian Games medalists in bowling
Southeast Asian Games gold medalists for Malaysia
Southeast Asian Games silver medalists for Malaysia
Southeast Asian Games bronze medalists for Malaysia
21st-century Malaysian women
Malaysian Christians
People from Petaling Jaya
Competitors at the 2005 Southeast Asian Games
Competitors at the 2007 Southeast Asian Games
Competitors at the 2015 Southeast Asian Games
Competitors at the 2017 Southeast Asian Games
Competitors at the 2019 Southeast Asian Games